Yazid ibn Khalid al-Qasri was a son of the famed Khalid al-Qasri, the longtime (724–738) governor of Iraq for the Umayyads.

Due to his father's imprisonment, torture, and death at the hands of al-Walid II's governor of Iraq, Yusuf ibn Umar al-Thaqafi, during the Third Fitna he sided with Yazid III, apparently serving as his sahib al-shurta. Following Yazid III's death, he is reported as the executioner of the two underage sons of al-Walid II, and then participated in the unsuccessful revolt of the Syrians in 745 against Marwan II. He besieged Damascus, but the city was relieved by Marwan II, and Yazid was executed by the latter. His namesake grandson Yazid ibn Jarir al-Qasri was governor of the Yemen under the Abbasid caliph al-Ma'mun.

References

Sources 
 
 

745 deaths
8th-century Arabs
8th-century people from the Umayyad Caliphate
8th-century executions by the Umayyad Caliphate
People of the Third Fitna